George Edmund Milnes Monckton-Arundell, 7th Viscount Galway, CB (18 November 1844 – 7 March 1931) was a British Conservative politician and courtier.

Biography
Galway was the son of George Monckton-Arundell, 6th Viscount Galway, and his wife and first cousin Henrietta Maria, daughter of Robert Pemberton Milnes and sister of Richard Monckton Milnes, 1st Baron Houghton. He was educated at Eton and Christ Church, Oxford. He entered Parliament for Nottinghamshire North in an 1872 by-election, a seat he held until 1885 when the constituency was abolished. He succeeded his father in the viscountcy in 1876 but as this was an Irish peerage he did not have to resign his seat in the House of Commons. On 4 July 1887 Galway was created Baron Monckton, of Serlby in the County of Nottingham, in the Peerage of the United Kingdom, which entitled him to an automatic seat in the House of Lords. He later served as an Aide-de-Camp to Queen Victoria from 1897 to 1901, to Edward VII from 1901 to 1910 and to George V from 1910 to 1920. He was also involved in local affairs and served as a Justice of the Peace and Deputy Lieutenant for Nottinghamshire and as Chairman and Alderman of the Nottinghamshire County Council.

Lord Galway married Vere Gosling, the only daughter of Ellis Gosling of Busbridge Hall, Surrey in 1879. She was invested as a Lady of Justice, Order of St. John of Jerusalem (L.J.St.J.). She died in 1921. Galway survived her by ten years and died in March 1931, aged 86. He was succeeded in his titles by his son George.

References

 Kidd, Charles, Williamson, David (editors). Debrett's Peerage and Baronetage (1990 edition). New York: St Martin's Press, 1990.
 
 
 Biography at The University of Nottingham

External links 
 

1844 births
1931 deaths
People educated at Eton College
Viscounts in the Peerage of Ireland
Conservative Party (UK) MPs for English constituencies
UK MPs 1868–1874
UK MPs 1874–1880
UK MPs 1880–1885
Galway, V7
UK MPs who were granted peerages
Peers of the United Kingdom created by Queen Victoria